Manchana may refer to:

 Tiquadra, a genus of moths belonging to the family Tineidae
 Manchana (poet), 12th or 13th century Telugu language poet from Velanati Choda kingdom of southern India
 Manchana Bhattaraka, a 7th century ruler of the Vishnukundina dynasty of southern India